The 1967–68 Mexican Segunda División was the 18th season of the Mexican Segunda División. The season started on 9 July 1967 and concluded on 25 February 1968. It was won by Laguna.

During this season, the Tercera División was created, so it was the first season in which the Second Division had a club relegated to a lower category, Orizaba was the first team to be relegated.

Changes 
 Pachuca was promoted to Primera División.
 Ciudad Madero was relegated from Primera División.
 The league was expanded from 16 to 18 teams, for that reason U. de N.L. and Unión de Curtidores joined the league.

Teams

League table

Results

References 

1967–68 in Mexican football
Segunda División de México seasons